U Love U may refer to:
"U Love U", a 2021 song by Blackbear featuring Tate McRae, see Blackbear discography
"U Love U", a 2022 song by Jax featuring Jvke, see Jax discography